The Jetsons is an American animated sitcom produced by Hanna-Barbera Productions. It originally aired in prime time from September 23, 1962, to March 17, 1963, on ABC, then later aired in reruns via syndication, with new episodes produced from 1985 to 1987. It was Hanna-Barbera's Space Age counterpart to The Flintstones.

While the Flintstones lived in a world which was a comical version of the Stone Age, with machines powered by birds and dinosaurs, the Jetsons live in a comical version of a century in the future, with elaborate robotic contraptions, aliens, holograms, and whimsical inventions.

The original had 24 episodes and aired on Sunday nights on ABC beginning on September 23, 1962, with prime time reruns continuing through September 22, 1963. It debuted as the first program broadcast in color on ABC, back in the early 1960s when only a handful of ABC stations were capable of broadcasting in color. In contrast, The Flintstones, while always produced in color, was broadcast in black-and-white for its first two seasons.

The show was originally scheduled opposite Walt Disney's Wonderful World of Color and Dennis the Menace and did not receive much attention. Due to poor ratings, it was cancelled after its first season but was then moved to Saturday mornings, where it went on to be very successful. Following its primetime run, the show aired on Saturday mornings for decades, starting on ABC for the 1963–64 season and then on CBS and NBC. New episodes were produced for syndication from 1985 to 1987. No further specials or episodes of the show were produced after 1989, as the majority of the core cast (George O'Hanlon, Mel Blanc, and Daws Butler) had died in 1988 and 1989. The 1990 film Jetsons: The Movie served as the series finale to the television show, though it failed to achieve critical and commercial success.

Premise
The Jetsons are a family residing in Orbit City. The city's architecture is rendered in the Googie style and all homes and businesses are raised high above the ground on adjustable columns. George Jetson lives with his family in the Skypad Apartments: his wife Jane is a homemaker, their teenage daughter Judy attends Orbit High School, and their son Elroy attends Little Dipper School. Housekeeping is performed by a robot maid named Rosie, who handles chores not otherwise rendered trivial by the home's numerous push-button Space Age-envisioned conveniences. The family has a dog named Astro that talks with an initial consonant mutation in which every word begins with an "R", as if speaking with a growl; a similar effect would also be used for Scooby-Doo.

George Jetson's work week consists of an hour a day, two days a week. His boss is Cosmo Spacely, the bombastic owner of Spacely Space Sprockets. Spacely has a competitor, Mr. Cogswell, owner of the rival company Cogswell Cogs (sometimes known as Cogswell's Cosmic Cogs). Jetson commutes to work in an aerocar with a transparent bubble top. Daily life is leisurely, assisted by numerous labor-saving devices, which occasionally break down with humorous results. Despite this, everyone complains of exhausting hard labor and difficulties living with the remaining inconveniences.

Characters

Voice cast

 George Jetson – George O'Hanlon
 Jane Jetson – Penny Singleton
 Elroy Jetson – Daws Butler
 Judy Jetson – Janet Waldo
 Astro the Space Mutt/RUDI/Uniblab/Mac – Don Messick
 Rosey/Mrs. Spacely/Miss Galaxy – Jean Vander Pyl
 Cosmo Spacely – Mel Blanc
 Spencer Cogswell – Daws Butler
 Henry Orbit – Daws Butler (Howard Morris in a few early Season 1 episodes) 
 Orbitty – Frank Welker
 DiDi – Selma Diamond (and Brenda Vaccaro after Diamond's death)

In later productions, Jeff Bergman has voiced George, Elroy, and Mr. Spacely. Bergman completed voice work as George and Spacely for Jetsons: The Movie (1990) after George O'Hanlon and Mel Blanc died during production. Controversially, Janet Waldo was replaced—after recording all of her dialogue—by then-popular singer Tiffany for Jetsons: The Movie. Lori Frazier has provided the voice of Jane Jetson in television commercials for Radio Shack.

Production

The first season for the series was produced and directed by William Hanna and Joseph Barbera. When Warner Bros. Cartoons closed in May 1961, several of its animators, including Gerry Chiniquy and Ken Harris, joined Hanna-Barbera to work on the first season.

Morey Amsterdam and Pat Carroll controversy
In 1963, Morey Amsterdam and Pat Carroll each filed $12,000 suits against Hanna-Barbera for breach of contract, claiming they had been cast and signed to the roles of George Jetson and Jane Jetson, respectively. Although their contracts stipulated they would be paid US$500 an episode with a guarantee of twenty-four episodes (i.e., a full season) of work, they recorded only one episode before being replaced. Several sources claimed the change had occurred as a result of sponsor conflict between Amsterdam's commitment to The Dick Van Dyke Show and Carroll's to Make Room for Daddy. The case had been closed by early 1965. In a 2013 interview, Pat Carroll indicated that the court had ruled in favor of Hanna-Barbera.

Episodes

The show's original run consisted of 24 episodes that first aired on ABC from September 23, 1962, to March 17, 1963, and, as was standard practice at the time, contained a laugh track.

In 1984, Hanna-Barbera began producing new episodes specifically for syndication; by September 1985, the 24 episodes from the first season were combined with 41 new episodes and began airing in morning or late afternoon time slots in 80 U.S. media markets, including the 30 largest. The 41 new episodes were produced at a cost of $300,000 each, and featured all of the voice actors from the 1962–1963 show. During 1987, 10 additional "season 3" episodes were also made available for syndication.

Broadcast history
Following its prime time cancellation, ABC placed reruns of The Jetsons on its Saturday morning schedule for the 1963–1964 season. The program would spend the next two decades on Saturday mornings, with subsequent runs on CBS (1964–65 and 1969–71) and NBC (1965–67; 1971–76; 1979–81 and 1982–83). The Jetsons began airing in syndication in September 1976, and these runs continued after the program returned to NBC's Saturday morning schedule. Along with fellow Hanna-Barbera production Jonny Quest and Warner Bros.' Looney Tunes shorts, The Jetsons is one of the few series to have aired on each of the Big Three television networks in the United States.

On February 21, 2021, The Jetsons began airing on MeTV.

Theme song
The series' theme song, by composer Hoyt Curtin, became a pop hit in 1986.

Science fiction themes
Animation historian Christopher P. Lehman considers that the series shares its main science fiction theme with Funderful Suburbia (1962), a Modern Madcaps animated short. Both feature people involved in space colonization. However, there is a key difference in the nature of the colonization: in Funderful Suburbia, humans colonize outer space in order to escape the problems of planet Earth, while the Jetsons live in a place where space colonization is already established. Life in outer space is depicted as a fact of life, and the reasons behind humanity's takeover of outer space are never explained.

Lehman argues that the series offers no explanation for its science fiction premise and does not directly satirize the social problems of any era. The setting is combined with standard sitcom elements, which serve as the series' main focus.

Smithsonian's Matt Novak, in an article called "Why The Show Still Matters" asserts, "Today The Jetsons stands as the single most important piece of 20th century futurism."

Novak continues, "It’s easy for some people to dismiss The Jetsons as just a TV show, and a lowly cartoon at that. But this little show—for better and for worse—has had a profound impact on the way that Americans think and talk about the future."

Reception
After the announcement of the fall 1962 network television schedule Time magazine characterized The Jetsons as one of several new situation comedies (along with The Beverly Hillbillies, I'm Dickens... He's Fenster, and Our Man Higgins) that was "stretching further than ever for their situations"; after all the season's new shows had premiered—a season "responding to Minow's exhortations"—the magazine called the series "silly and unpretentious, corny and clever, now and then quite funny." Of all the aforementioned programs in the Time article including The Jetsons, only The Beverly Hillbillies (which would remain on the air until CBS's rural purge in 1971) would make it back for a 2nd season in 1963.

Thirty years later, Time wrote: "In an age of working mothers, single parents and gay matrimony (same-sex marriage), George Jetson and his clan already seem quaint even to the baby boomers who grew up with them." In contrast, economist Jeffrey A. Tucker wrote in 2011 that The Jetsons is "distinguished in science-fiction lore by
the fact that it is a rare attempt in this genre that actually succeeds in predicting the future." Apart from flying cars, which are as yet unfeasible in the real world ("a lot of fun, until that first accident occurs"), much of the technology of The Jetsons has become commonplace: people now communicate via video chat on flat screens; domestic robots such as the Roomba are widespread, and various high-tech devices are used for leisure. Tucker notes that The Jetsons depicts neither a grim dystopia nor an idyllic utopia, but rather a world where capitalism and entrepreneurship still exist and technology has not changed fundamental elements of human nature.

In 2017, Devon Maloney from The Verge described the show as a "bone-chilling dystopia", stating how a reboot-comic book revealed that an environmental apocalypse caused humans to seek refuge in aerial cities. Maloney also notes the lack of people of color in the show and theorizes how discrimination against impoverished groups and developing countries could've taken place, stating "though long held up as the quintessential utopia, The Jetsons is a perfect dystopia, built on the corpses of a billions-strong underclass deemed unworthy of a life in the clouds."

Differences between versions

Added characters:
 In the first episode of the 1980s episodes, an alien named Orbitty joined the family after Elroy discovered him on a field trip to an asteroid. Orbitty speaks in his own garbled dialect, has coil springs for legs, and changes colors according to his mood.
 Various appliances appear in the 1980s episodes such as Memo-Minder and Di-Di, Judy's diary, which is shaped like a giant pair of wax lips.

Other differences include the following:
 The original 1960s episodes are distinguished by 1960s design motifs, music, and references (similar to The Flintstones and other Hanna-Barbera shows of that period). The 1980s version had a custom soundtrack with new sound-effects created by synthesizer.
 Whereas the 1960s stories were basically 1950s sitcom plots in a setting, the 1980s stories delved into fantastic, sci-fi cartoon territory.
 The 1960s version was more adult-oriented than the 1980s version, which was aimed at younger viewers.
 The 1980s opening credits contain a re-recorded version of the original Jetsons theme song, which features the use of synthesized drums and synth lead tracks typical of 1980s music.
 The 1960s closing credits were similar to the closing credits scenes from The Flintstones, which feature the family getting ready for bed as well as a disaster with their pets. In The Jetsons, George is walking Astro on a treadmill, Astro chases a cat, and then both animals jumping off after the treadmill malfunctions leaving Jetson running for his life. The 1980s version had to accommodate a larger production staff, including dozens of voice actors, and this closing credits segment was replaced with static multicolored backgrounds with pictures of The Jetsons arranged next to numerous credits. The 1960s episodes were rereleased with the redesigned closing segment (containing fewer production staff credits than the 1980s episodes, but has more names than the original closing scene which left several people uncredited) but are usually seen rebroadcast with their original credits segment.
 The 1960s episodes do not contain title cards. When the 1980s episodes were made, title cards were also made for the 1960s episodes, which explains the appearance of Orbitty in the title cards of the 1960s episodes. (Orbitty also appears in the 1980s closing credits, which style was also used for the 1960s episodes.)
 Many of the 1980s episodes were colored and composited using computer animation technology including digital ink and paint, rather than the more traditional ink and paint on cels.
 The backgrounds in the 1980s version contain vivid colors, and are more detailed than the 1960s version.
 While the 1960s episodes referenced rockets and other "space age" theme devices, reflective of the real-life American space program which fascinated the United States, the 1980s episodes leaned more towards how computers would influence life in outer space.
 In the 1980s version, Rosie the Robot appears more often than in the 1960s (when she only appeared in two episodes). Astro is also featured more prominently.
 The original spelling of Rosie's name is "Rosey", as featured in the 1962 premiere "Rosey the Robot". Her spelling was modified to "Rosie", as featured in the 1985 episode "Rosie Come Home".
 Instead of the buttons, knobs, dials, and switches in the 1960s version, the 1980s version uses flat buttons and brightly lit consoles.
 The 1960s episodes were fitted with a laugh track (as was The Flintstones); the 1980s episodes were not.
 Many of the 1980s episodes were released in stereo sound, a first for series starring classic Hanna-Barbera characters.

Specials and film adaptations

Television films
 The Jetsons Meet the Flintstones (1987)
 Rockin' with Judy Jetson (1988)

Television specials
 Hanna-Barbera's 50th: A Yabba Dabba Doo Celebration (1989)

Theatrical releases
 Jetsons: The Movie (1990)

Direct-to-video films
 The Jetsons & WWE: Robo-WrestleMania! (2017)

Proposed continuations and reboots

A 1974 proposal would have created a sequel series to The Jetsons, set roughly ten years after the original series. CBS rejected the proposal and it was retooled into Partridge Family 2200 A.D.

Paramount Pictures first tried to film a live-action version of The Jetsons in 1985, which was to be executive produced by Gary Nardino, but failed to do so. In the late 1980s, Universal Pictures purchased the film rights for The Flintstones and The Jetsons from Hanna-Barbera Productions. The result was Jetsons: The Movie, which was released in 1990. In November 2001, screenwriting duo Paul Foley and Dan Forman were brought onboard to revise a screenplay, with Rob Minkoff attached as director and Denise Di Novi as producer.

On March 18, 2003, it was announced that the script was again being reworked, with Adam Shankman entering negotiations to direct and co-write the film. In June 2004, with Shankman still onboard as director, Di Novi confirmed that the latest draft was penned by Sam Harper. By May 2006, the project was re-launched with Adam F. Goldberg confirmed as the new screenwriter, and Donald De Line was added as producer alongside Di Novi.

In May 2007, director Robert Rodriguez entered talks with Universal Studios and Warner Bros. to film a CGI adaptation of The Jetsons for a potential 2009 theatrical release, having at the time discussed directing a film adaptation of Land of the Lost with Universal. Rodriguez was uncertain which project he would pursue next, though the latest script draft for The Jetsons by Goldberg was further along in development.

In January 2012, recording artist Kanye West was mistakenly reported as creative director over the project, though West clarified on social media that "I was just discussing becoming the creative director for the Jetson [sic] movie and someone on the call yelled out.. you should do a Jetsons tour!" Longtime producer Denise Di Novi denied the confirmed involvement stating negotiations with West via conference call was merely "preliminary and exploratory and introductory". In February 2012, Warner Bros. hired Van Robichaux and Evan Susser to rewrite the script.

On January 23, 2015, it was announced that Warner Bros. is planning a new animated Jetsons feature film, with Matt Lieberman to provide the screenplay. As of May 25, 2017, Conrad Vernon will direct the film.

On August 17, 2017, ABC ordered a pilot for a live-action sitcom version of The Jetsons to be written by Gary Janetti and executive produced by Janetti, Jack Rapke and Robert Zemeckis.

Further appearances

Hanna-Barbera-related
 The Funtastic World of Hanna-Barbera (ride), Elroy Jetson is kidnapped by Dick Dastardly (from Wacky Races and Dastardly and Muttley in Their Flying Machines) and it is up to ride guests to save him. (1991)
 Space Stars, Astro appeared in the segment "Astro and the Space Mutts".

Other projects

 The Jetsons: Father & Son Day (Spümcø, Macromedia Flash)
 The Jetsons: The Best Son (Spümcø, Macromedia Flash)
 Some characters appeared in commercials for Electrasol and Tums.
 In the late 1990s, George, Jane, and Astro appeared in Christmas-season commercials for Radio Shack.
 In 2003, New Zealand ISP Xtra used The Jetsons as part of an advertising campaign, with George Jetson promoting the benefits of broadband Internet. The advert ended with George saying, "Broadband is the way, but some people will never get used to progress", and an image of Fred Flintstone using a stone shaped computer with a real mouse.
 The Jetsons have appeared in Family Guy three times, on "Brian in Love" (s2, ep4, May 7, 2000), "From Method to Madness" (s4, ep18, January 24, 2002), and on "Meet the Quagmires" (s5, ep18, May 20, 2007).
 The Jetsons were seen in a Cartoon Network Rap in 1995.
 The Jetsons characters were in a parody of I, Robot done on Robot Chicken where Rosie is accused of murdering George.
 The Jetsons can be seen in the background in the "MetLife" commercial "Everyone" in 2012.
 The Jetsons appear in Harvey Birdman, Attorney at Law, in the episode "Back to the Present" (s2, ep6 [16], May 16, 2004).
 The Jetsons family makes a cameo appearance in the 2021 film Space Jam: A New Legacy. They appear among the crowd of other Hanna-Barbera and Warner Bros. characters as spectators during the game between the Tune Squad and the Goon Squad. While George and Jane watch from their flying car, Elroy, Judy, Astro, and Rosie watch from the ground.

Educational films
 Hanna-Barbera Educational Filmstrips
 The Jetsons: Geometric Jetson (1978)
 The Jetsons: Down to Earth Nutrition (1980)
 Learning Tree Filmstrip Set
 Learning About Work with The Jetsons (1982)

Comics

 The Jetsons #1–36 (Gold Key Comics, January 1963 – October 1970)
 March of Comics #276 (1965), #330 (1969), #348
 The Jetsons #1–20 (Charlton Comics, November 1970 – December 1973); 100-page no-number issue
 Spotlight #3 (Marvel Comics, 197x)
 The Jetsons #1–5 (Harvey Comics, September 1992 – November 1993); Big Book #1–3, Giant Size #1–3
 The Jetsons #1–17 (Archie Comics, September 1995 – August 1996)
 The Flintstones and the Jetsons #1–21 (DC Comics, August 1997 – April 1999)
 Scooby Doo Team-Up #8 (DC Comics, January 2015)
 Booster Gold/The Flintstones Annual #1 (DC Comics, March 2017)
 The Jetsons #1–6 (DC Comics, January – June 2018)

Video games

 The Jetsons' Ways with Words (Intellivision – 1984)
 The Jetsons: George Jetson and the Legend of Robotopia (Amiga – 1990)
 The Jetsons: By George, in Trouble Again (DOS – 1990)
 Jetsons: The Computer Game (Commodore 64, ZX Spectrum, Amstrad CPC – 1991, Amiga – 1992)
 The Jetsons: Cogswell's Caper! (NES – 1992)
 The Jetsons: Robot Panic (Game Boy – 1992)
 The Jetsons: Mealtime Malfunction (Apple – 1993)
 The Jetsons' Space Race (part of Hanna-Barbera's Cartoon Carnival) (CD-i – 1993, Macintosh – 1995, Windows 3.x – 1995)
 The Jetsons: Invasion of the Planet Pirates (Super NES – 1994)
 Flintstones/Jetsons: Time Warp (CD-i – 1994)

Home media
On June 28, 1990, Hanna-Barbera Home Video released six episodes from the show on videocassette. Warner Home Video released season 1 on DVD in Region 1 on May 11, 2004; upon its release, James Poniewozik wrote that it is "as much about New Frontier 1962 as about the distant future. Its ditzy slapstick is like the peanut-butter-and-jelly mix Goober Grape—if you didn't love it as a kid, you're not going to acquire the taste as an adult—and the pop-culture gags ... have not aged well. But the animation is still a classic of gee-whiz atomic-age modernism."

The review of the DVD release from Entertainment Weekly said the show "trots through surprisingly dated sitcom plots about blustery bosses, bad lady drivers, and Elvis Presleyesque teen idols, all greeted with laugh tracks" but points out "it's the appeal of the retro-prescient gadgets (recliner massagers, big-screen TVs, two-way monitors) that still carries the show." Season 1 was released on DVD in Region 4 on July 5, 2006. Season Two, Volume 1 was released on DVD almost three years later, on June 2, 2009, for Region 1.

On November 8, 2011, Warner Home Video (via the Warner Archive Collection) released The Jetsons: Season 2, Volume 2 on DVD in Region 1 as part of their Hanna-Barbera Classics Collection. This is a Manufacture-on-Demand (MOD) release, available exclusively through Warner's online store and Amazon.com. Warner Archive followed up by releasing Season 3 in the same way on May 13, 2014.

The complete ABC series was released on Blu-ray on September 10, 2019, by Warner Home Video (again via the Warner Archive Collection), sourced from new 2K scans of the original broadcast masters while maintaining the show's original 4:3 aspect ratio.

Legacy
 Boomerang aired the show from April 1, 2000, to April 6, 2014, and the series returned to Boomerang on July 2, 2016, to March 6, 2017. Cartoon Network aired the show from 1992 to 2004 and returned the series October 2012. Also, some of the 1980s episodes were available for viewing on In2TV prior to its shutdown; these episodes were later moved to the online version of Kids' WB. Also the first two seasons of The Jetsons are available to download on Sony's PlayStation Network, Apple's iTunes Store and at the Xbox Live Marketplace. The Kids' WB website eventually shut down in 2015, however, the Kids' WB episodes can still be streamed, thanks to much of the website being preserved by the Internet Archive's Wayback Machine.
 Forbes magazine valued Spacely Sprockets at $1.3 billion, on its "The 25 Largest Fictional Companies" list.
 The original cartoon series had several devices that did not exist at the time but subsequently have not only been invented but are in common usage: a flatscreen television, newspaper on a computer-like screen, a computer virus, video chat, a tanning bed, home treadmill and more.
 In January 2009, IGN listed The Jetsons as the 46th best animated television series.

See also

 List of works produced by Hanna-Barbera Productions
 List of Hanna-Barbera characters
 Design for Dreaming
 Googie architecture

References

Citations

General and cited references

Further reading

External links

 
 The Jetsons at the Big Cartoon DataBase
 The Jetsons at Don Markstein's Toonopedia
 Jetson's Movie
 The Cartoon Scrapbook – Profile on The Jetsons.

 
1960s American animated television series
1960s American comic science fiction television series
1960s American sitcoms
1962 American television series debuts
1963 American television series endings
1980s American animated television series
1980s American comic science fiction television series
1980s American sitcoms
1985 American television series debuts
1987 American television series endings
American animated science fantasy television series
American animated sitcoms
American Broadcasting Company original programming
American children's animated comic science fiction television series
American children's animated science fantasy television series
American comic science fiction television series
American television series revived after cancellation
Animated television series about children
Animated television series about families
Archie Comics titles
CBS original programming
Charlton Comics titles
DC Comics titles
English-language television shows
First-run syndicated television programs in the United States
Flying cars in fiction
Gold Key Comics titles
Harvey Comics titles
Marvel Comics titles
Television series by Hanna-Barbera
Television series by Screen Gems
Television series by Sony Pictures Television
Television series by Warner Bros. Television Studios
Television series set in the future
Television shows adapted into comics
Television shows adapted into films
Television shows adapted into video games
The Funtastic World of Hanna-Barbera